The Monroe Lake Archeological District is a U.S. historic district (designated as such on November 5, 1996) located southwest of Homestead, Florida, in the vicinity of Monroe Lake.

References

External links
 Dade County listings at National Register of Historic Places

Archaeological sites in Florida
Geography of Miami-Dade County, Florida
National Register of Historic Places in Miami-Dade County, Florida
Historic districts on the National Register of Historic Places in Florida
National Register of Historic Places in Everglades National Park
1996 establishments in Florida